Fasciculation and elongation protein zeta-1 is a protein that in humans is encoded by the FEZ1 gene.

This gene is an ortholog of the C. elegans unc-76 gene, which is necessary for normal axonal bundling and elongation within axon bundles. Expression of this gene in C. elegans unc-76 mutants can restore to the mutants partial locomotion and axonal fasciculation, suggesting that it also functions in axonal outgrowth. The N-terminal half of the gene product is highly acidic. Alternatively spliced transcript variants encoding different isoforms of this protein have been described.

This protein is present in neurons, and it is believed to block the process of infection of these cells by HIV.

Interactions
FEZ1 has been shown to interact with Protein kinase Mζ, NBR1 and DISC1.

References

Further reading